Terry L. Martin (born October 10, 1980) is an American mixed martial artist who most recently competed in the Middleweight division. A professional MMA competitor since 2003, he has formerly competed for the UFC, Affliction, Strikeforce, the MFC, King of the Cage, and Adrenaline MMA.

Early life
Martin grew up on the West Side of Chicago, Illinois. Joining a street gang by the age of 10, Martin was nearly killed at the age of 15 in the summer of 1996, when he was caught in a drive-by shooting and hit by five bullets in his legs, chest and back.  After recuperating, Martin turned his back on gang life and focused on his education, becoming the first member of his immediate family to earn his high-school diploma.  Since graduating from high school, Martin has additionally attained a Bachelor of Science degree, a master's degree, and he is currently enrolled at the Adler School of Psychology's Chicago campus as a doctoral candidate. He wrestled while at Northern Illinois University. Martin has also begun to use the fame that mixed martial arts has given him to speak to inner-city children about his life and accomplishments, urging them to stay in school.

Boxing career
Martin made his professional boxing debut on April 12, 2008, and defeated Ricardo Upchurch by knockout in 40 seconds. Martin won his next four bouts via knockout or technical knockout. On November 21, 2012 Martin suffered his first loss as professional boxer when he was TKOed in the third round by Dimar Ortuz.

Mixed martial arts career

Early career
Martin made his professional MMA debut in 2002, a decision loss to Stephan Bonnar, before winning his next ten fights. Martin was then signed by the UFC.

Ultimate Fighting Championship
Martin made his UFC debut on August 20, 2005 at UFC 54 against former WEC Light Heavyweight Champion James Irvin. After dominating the first round of the fight, Martin was knocked out by a flying knee nine seconds into the second round.

Martin had two appearances in King of the Cage, both finishes, before returning at UFC 59 against Jason Lambert. Martin lost via second-round TKO.

Martin bounced back, winning another two fights in outside promotions before returning to face Jorge Rivera at UFC 67 in Martin's Middleweight debut. Martin knocked out Rivera 14 seconds into the first round. He then fought Ivan Salaverry at UFC 71, winning again via first-round TKO with a suplex and punches.

Martin then fought Chris Leben at UFC Fight Night 11. Martin lost via knockout late in the third round. Martin next faced Marvin Eastman at UFC 81, who defeated him via unanimous decision. After his second consecutive loss, Martin was released from the UFC.

Post-UFC
After leaving the UFC, Martin made his next big appearance at Affliction: Banned against Vitor Belfort. Martin was knocked out in the second round.

Martin next made his Strikeforce debut against Cory Devela on September 20, 2008. Martin won via third-round KO.

However, Martin would go on to lose via knockout to Scott Smith only 24 seconds into the fight at Strikeforce: Destruction.

Independent promotions
Since losing to Smith, Martin has gone 5-5 in his last ten fights.

Championships and accomplishments
Ultimate Fighting Championship
Knockout of the Night (One time)

Mixed martial arts record

|-
| Loss
| align=center| 23–12
| Erick Lozano
| KO (flying knee)
| KOP 59
| 
| align=center| 1
| align=center| 2:11
| Grand Rapids, Michigan, United States
|Catchweight bout of 191 lbs; Martin missed weight.
|-
| Win
| align=center| 23–11
| Jason Ramos
| Decision (majority)
| MaxxFC 33
| 
| align=center| 5
| align=center| 5:00
| Bayamon, Puerto Rico
|Won MaxxFC Middleweight Championship.
|-
| Loss
| align=center| 22–11
| Matt Horwich
| TKO (punches)
| KSW XXI
| 
| align=center| 2
| align=center| 4:08
| Warsaw, Poland
|Catchweight bout of 191 lbs.
|-
| Win
| align=center| 22–10
| Allen Hope
| TKO (punches and elbows)
| MFC 31: The Rundown
| 
| align=center| 1
| align=center| 2:13
| Edmonton, Alberta, Canada
| Middleweight bout.
|-
| Loss
| align=center| 21–10
| Douglas Lima
| TKO (punches)
| MFC 29: Conquer
| 
| align=center| 1
| align=center| 1:14
| Windsor, Ontario, Canada
| 
|-
| Win
| align=center| 21–9
| Josh Martin
| TKO (punches)
| Nemesis Fighting: MMA Global Invasion
| 
| align=center| 1
| align=center| 1:27
| Punta Cana, Dominican Republic
| 
|-
| Win
| align=center| 20–9
| Jorge Ortiz
| Decision (split)
| Powerhouse World Promotions: War on the Mainland
| 
| align=center| 3
| align=center| 5:00
| Irvine, California, United States
| 
|-
| Win
| align=center| 19–9
| Ted Worthington
| Decision (unanimous)
| KOTC: Turbulence 2
| 
| align=center| 3
| align=center| 5:00
| Lac du Flambeau, Wisconsin, United States
| 
|-
| Loss
| align=center| 18–9
| Julio Paulino
| KO (punch)
| Arena Rumble II
| 
| align=center| 3
| align=center| 3:40
| Spokane, Washington, United States
| 
|-
| Loss
| align=center| 18–8
| Zak Cummings
| Decision (unanimous)
| XCF: Rumble in Racetown
| 
| align=center| 3
| align=center| 5:00
| Daytona, Florida, United States
| 
|-
| Loss
| align=center| 18–7
| Scott Smith
| KO (punch)
| Strikeforce: Destruction
| 
| align=center| 1
| align=center| 0:24
| San Jose, California, United States
| 
|-
| Win
| align=center| 18–6
| Cory Devela
| KO (punch)
| Strikeforce: At The Mansion II
| 
| align=center| 3
| align=center| 2:08
| Beverly Hills, California, United States
| 
|-
| Loss
| align=center| 17–6
| Vitor Belfort
| KO (punch)
| Affliction: Banned
| 
| align=center| 2
| align=center| 3:12
| Anaheim, California, United States
| 
|-
| Win
| align=center| 17–5
| Daiju Takase
| DQ (groin kicks)
| Adrenaline MMA: Guida vs Russow
| 
| align=center| 2
| align=center| 3:35
| Chicago, Illinois, United States
| 
|-
| Loss
| align=center| 16–5
| Marvin Eastman
| Decision (unanimous)
| UFC 81
| 
| align=center| 3
| align=center| 5:00
| Las Vegas, Nevada, United States
| 
|-
| Loss
| align=center| 16–4
| Chris Leben
| KO (punch)
| UFC Fight Night 11
| 
| align=center| 3
| align=center| 3:56
| Las Vegas, Nevada, United States
| 
|-
| Win
| align=center| 16–3
| Ivan Salaverry
| TKO (suplex and punches)
| UFC 71
| 
| align=center| 1
| align=center| 2:04
| Las Vegas, Nevada, United States
| 
|-
| Win
| align=center| 15–3
| Jorge Rivera
| KO (punches)
| UFC 67
| 
| align=center| 1
| align=center| 0:14
| Las Vegas, Nevada, United States
| 
|-
| Win
| align=center| 14–3
| Jason Guida
| KO (punch)
| XFO 13
| 
| align=center| 3
| align=center| 0:08
| Hoffman Estates, Illinois, United States
| 
|-
| Win
| align=center| 13–3
| Keith Berry
| TKO (punches)
| WEC 24: Full Force
| 
| align=center| 1
| align=center| 2:52
| Lemoore, California, United States
| 
|-
| Loss
| align=center| 12–3
| Jason Lambert
| TKO (punches)
| UFC 59: Reality Check
| 
| align=center| 2
| align=center| 2:37
| Anaheim, California, United States
| 
|-
| Win
| align=center| 12–2
| Trevor Garrett
| KO (punch)
| KOTC: Redemption on the River
| 
| align=center| 1
| align=center| 1:40
| Moline, Illinois, United States
| 
|-
| Win
| align=center| 11–2
| Ron Fields
| Submission (guillotine choke)
| KOTC 64: Raging Bull
| 
| align=center| 2
| align=center| 2:37
| Cleveland, Ohio, United States
| 
|-
| Loss
| align=center| 10–2
| James Irvin
| KO (flying knee)
| UFC 54: Boiling Point
| 
| align=center| 2
| align=center| 0:09
| Las Vegas, Nevada, United States
| 
|-
| Win
| align=center| 10–1
| Jerry Spiegel
| TKO (punches)
| Combat: Do Fighting Challenge 3
| 
| align=center| 2
| align=center| 1:55
| Illinois, United States
| 
|-
| Win
| align=center| 9–1
| Homer Moore
| TKO (submission to punches)
|  WEC 14: Vengeance
| 
| align=center| 2
| align=center| 3:14
| Lemoore, California, United States
| 
|-
| Win
| align=center| 8–1
| Jerry Spiegel
| TKO (knee)
| Combat: Do Fighting Challenge 2
| 
| align=center| 1
| align=center| 1:09
| Illinois, United States
| 
|-
| Win
| align=center| 7–1
| Chael Sonnen
| TKO (corner stoppage)
| Xtreme Fighting Organization 4
| 
| align=center| 2
| align=center| 5:00
| McHenry, Illinois, United States
| 
|-
| Win
| align=center| 6–1
| Jeff Gerlick
| Submission (guillotine choke)
| Combat: Do Fighting Challenge 1
| 
| align=center| 1
| align=center| 2:58
| Cicero, Illinois, United States
| 
|-
| Win
| align=center| 5–1
| William Hill
| KO (punches)
| Xtreme Fighting Organization 3
| 
| align=center| 3
| align=center| 0:19
| McHenry, Illinois, United States
| 
|-
| Win
| align=center| 4–1
| William Hill
| KO (punches)
| IHC 7: The Crucible
| 
| align=center| 2
| align=center| 2:57
| Hammond, Indiana, United States
| 
|-
| Win
| align=center| 3–1
| Greg Franklin
| Submission (americana)
| Extreme Challenge 54
| 
| align=center| 1
| align=center| 2:27
| Lakemoor, Illinois, United States
| 
|-
| Win
| align=center| 2–1
| Ron Fields
| Submission (rear-naked choke)
| Extreme Challenge 51
| 
| align=center| 1
| align=center| 10:00
| St. Charles, Illinois, United States
| 
|-
| Win
| align=center| 1–1
| Rob Smith
| Decision
| Silverback Classic 16
| 
| align=center| 3
| align=center| 5:00
| Canton, Illinois, United States
| 
|-
| Loss
| align=center| 0–1
| Stephan Bonnar
| Decision (unanimous)
| Maximum Fighting Challenge
| 
| align=center| 1
| align=center| 10:00
| Hammond, Indiana, United States
|

Professional boxing record 

|-
| style="text-align:center;" colspan="8"|5 Wins (5 knockouts, 0 decisions), 1 Loss 
|-  style="text-align:center; background:#e3e3e3;"
|  style="border-style:none none solid solid; "|Res.
|  style="border-style:none none solid solid; "|Record
|  style="border-style:none none solid solid; "|Opponent
|  style="border-style:none none solid solid; "|Type
|  style="border-style:none none solid solid; "|Rd., Time
|  style="border-style:none none solid solid; "|Date
|  style="border-style:none none solid solid; "|Location
|  style="border-style:none none solid solid; "|Notes
|- align=center
|Loss
|5–1
|align=left| Dimar Ortuz
|TKO || 3 (6), 2:27
|November 21, 2012 || Horseshoe Casino, Hammond, Indiana, United States ||Cruiserweight
|- align=center
|Win
|5–0
|align=left| Thomas Boose
|KO || 1 (4), N/A
|November 23, 2011 || The Belvedere, Elk Grove, Illinois, United States ||Heavyweight
|- align=center
|Win
|4–0
|align=left| Rodelle Bolar
|KO || 1 (4), 1:21
|February 20, 2010 || Horseshoe Casino, Hammond, Indiana, United States ||Cruiserweight
|- align=center
|Win
|3–0
|align=left| Jadell Wells
|TKO || 3 (4), 2:59
|November 20, 2009 || Lumiere Casino, Saint Louis, Missouri, United States|| Cruiserweight
|- align=center
|Win
|2–0
|align=left| Rayvon Wilson
|KO || 2 (4), 2:31
|August 21, 2009 || Horseshoe Casino, Hammond, Indiana, United States|| Cruiserweight
|- align=center
|Win
|1–0
|align=left| Ricardo Upchurch
|KO || 1 (4), 0:47
|April 11, 2008 || The Odeum, Villa Park, Illinois, United States|| Cruiserweight
|- align=center

See also
List of male mixed martial artists

References

External links 

 

1980 births
Living people
Northern Illinois University alumni
Boxers from Chicago
American shooting survivors
American male mixed martial artists
African-American mixed martial artists
Mixed martial artists from Illinois
Welterweight mixed martial artists
Middleweight mixed martial artists
Light heavyweight mixed martial artists
Mixed martial artists utilizing collegiate wrestling
Mixed martial artists utilizing boxing
African-American boxers
Cruiserweight boxers
American male boxers
Ultimate Fighting Championship male fighters
21st-century African-American sportspeople
20th-century African-American people